Senden İbaret (Including You) is the first studio album by Turkish singer Hande Yener. It was released on 31 May 2000 by DMC.

Yener worked on the album together with Altan Çetin, and with the release of the music video for "Yalanın Batsın" she succeeded in earning fame. She continued this success through releasing two more music videos: "Bunun Adı Ayrılık" and "Yoksa Mani".

Due to her successful breakthrough, she received the "Best Newcomer Artist of the Year" award at the Golden Butterfly Awards in November 2000. Yener also received the "Best Newcomer Female Artist" award at the 9th Kral TV Video Music Awards in 2001. The album sold 750,000 copies within the scope of one year.

Track listing

Personnel 

 Hande Yener – main vocals
 Altan Çetin – songwriter, composer, arranger, music director
 Ercan Saatçi – producer, songwriter, backing vocals
 Hakan Altun – songwriter, composer
 Ozan Doğulu – composer
 Ercüment Vural – arranger, backing vocals
 Volkan Şanda – arranger, backing vocals
 Özgür Yedievli – arranger
 Serdar Ağırlı – mixing, mastering
 Eyüp Hamiş – ney
 Serdar Mumbuç – guitar
 Hüsnü Şenlendirici – trumpet
 Cüneyt Coşkuner – violin
 Erdoğan Şenyaylar – violin
 Fahri Karaduman – violin
 Mehmet Şenyaylar – violin
 Murat Süngü – violin
 Tarık Kemancı – violin
 Özcan Şenyaylar – violin
 Murat Başaran – recording
 Berna Anter – backing vocals
 Berna Keser – backing vocals
 Reha Felay – backing vocals
 Cemil Ağacıkoğlu – photography
 İzzet Angel – art director
 Gayer DMC – graphic design

Credits adapted from Senden İbarets album booklet.

References

External links 
Senden İbaret – Discogs

2000 debut albums
Hande Yener albums